The High Commissioner of Canada to Trinidad and Tobago is Canada's foremost diplomatic representative in the Republic of Trinidad and Tobago.

Countries belonging to the Commonwealth of Nations typically exchange High Commissioners, rather than Ambassadors. Though there are a few technical differences (for instance, whereas Ambassadors present their diplomatic credentials to the host country's head of state, High Commissioners are accredited to the head of government), they are in practice one and the same office. The following persons have served as Canadian High Commissioner to Trinidad and Tobago.

List of heads of mission

Commissioners to Trinidad and Tobago
 Robert Guy Carrington Smith (1958-1962)

High Commissioners to Trinidad and Tobago
 Robert Guy Carrington Smith (1962-1962)
 Eric Herbert Gilmour (1962-1966)
 James Russell McKinney (1966-1969)
 Gerald Anthony Rau (1969-1972)
 David Chalmer Reece (1972-1974)
 Angus James Matheson (1974-1977)
 James Edward Cooper (1977-1978)
 Paul-Eugène Laberge (1978-1982)
 James Byron Bissett (1982-1985)
 James Calbert Best (1985-1988)
 Rodney Irwin (1988-1990)
 Martha Dilys Buckley-Jones (1990-1993)
 Jean Nadeau (1993-1994)
 Marc C. Lemieux (1994-1997)
 Peter Lloyd (1997-2001)
 Simon Wade (2001-2005)
 Howard Strauss (2005-2009)
 Karen L. McDonald (2009-2012)
 Gérard Latulippe (2013 to 2018)
 Carla Hogan Rufelds (2018-)

References

External links
Official website - of the Canadian High Commission in Trinidad and Tobago (English)
Official website - of the Canadian High Commission in Trinidad and Tobago (Français)

Trinidad and Tobago, List of High Commissioners from Canada to
 
Canada